Sebastian Junger (born January 17, 1962) is an American journalist, author and filmmaker who has reported in-the-field on dirty, dangerous and demanding occupations and the experience of infantry combat. He is the author of The Perfect Storm: A True Story of Men Against the Sea (1997) which was adapted into a major motion picture and led to a resurgence in adventure creative nonfiction writing. He covered the War in Afghanistan for more than a decade, often embedded in dangerous and remote military outposts.  The book War (2010) was drawn from his field reporting for Vanity Fair, that also served as the background for the documentary film Restrepo (2010) which received the Grand Jury Prize for best documentary at the 2010 Sundance Film Festival. Junger's works explore themes such as brotherhood, trauma, and the relationship of the individual to society as told from the far reaches of human experience.

Background
Junger was born in Belmont, Massachusetts, the son of Ellen Sinclair, a painter, and Miguel Chapero Junger, a physicist. Born in Dresden, Germany, and of Russian, Austrian, Spanish, and Italian descent, his father immigrated to the United States during World War II to escape persecution because of paternal Jewish ancestry, and to study engineering at MIT. Junger grew up in the Belmont neighborhood, which he learned was the territory of the Boston Strangler. He was later inspired to write A Death in Belmont (2006).

Junger graduated from Concord Academy in 1980 and received a bachelor of arts degree from Wesleyan University in cultural anthropology in 1984. As an accomplished long-distance runner, he spent a summer training on the Navajo Nation reservation and wrote his thesis on Navajo long-distance running and its traditional, pre-Columbian roots.

Career
Junger began working as a freelance writer, often trying to publish articles on topics that interested him. He often took other jobs for temporary periods of time to support himself. Researching dangerous occupations as a topic, he became deeply engaged in learning about commercial fishing and its hazards.

In 1997, with the success of his non-fiction book, The Perfect Storm, Junger was touted as a new Hemingway. His work stimulated renewed interest in adventure non-fiction. The book received a large pre-publication deal for movie rights, was on the New York Times bestseller list for a year in the hardback edition, and for two years in paperback.

In 2000 Junger published an article "The Forensics of War," in Vanity Fair. He received a National Magazine Award for this. He continues to work there as a contributing editor. In early 2007, he reported from Nigeria on the subject of blood oil. With British photographer Tim Hetherington, Junger created The Other War: Afghanistan, produced with ABC News and Vanity Fair. It was shown on Nightline in September 2008 and the two men shared the DuPont-Columbia Award for broadcast journalism for the work.

His book War (2010) revolves around a platoon of the US Army 173rd Airborne stationed in Afghanistan.

Junger, along with Hetherington, used material gathered in the Korengal Valley of Afghanistan for the book and to create a related documentary feature Restrepo. The film was nominated for an Academy Award for Best Documentary Feature and won the Grand Jury Prize for a domestic documentary at the Sundance Film Festival in 2010. On April 27, 2011, Junger was presented with the "Leadership in Entertainment Award" by Iraq and Afghanistan Veterans of America (IAVA) for his work on Restrepo.

Junger's book, Tribe: On Homecoming and Belonging, was published in May 2016.

Junger has a chapter giving advice in Tim Ferriss' book Tools of Titans.

His latest work Freedom, on the American ideal of the same name, was published by Simon & Schuster in 2021.

While much of Junger's writing is subjective and participatory, he strives to maintain a neutral point of view and avoids contemporary political discussion, especially around frequent subjects like economic inequality and war. In 2021, he cited his "favorite quote" in an interview with The Guardian: "Journalists don't tell people what to think. They tell them what to think about."

Personal life
Junger lives in New York City and rural Cape Cod. He's married and lives with his wife and two children. His first daughter was born in 2016 when he was age 55. Previously, Junger was married to writer Daniela Petrova. They divorced in 2014. He is an atheist.

Junger co-owned a bar in New York City called the Half King. Named after a Seneca warrior that played colonial forces against each other in the Seven Years War, the bar hosted in-house readings and photo exhibits and was favored by war correspondents and conflict photographers. Rising rents made the business unsustainable, and the Half King closed in 2019 after 19 years of operation.

In June 2020, Junger had a near-death experience when his pancreatic artery ruptured while he was at home in rural Truro, Massachusetts. He is working on a book about the experience, tentatively titled Pulse: What Keeps Us Alive and What Happens When We Die.

Notable work

The Perfect Storm

Junger's book The Perfect Storm: A True Story of Men Against the Sea (1997) became an international bestseller. It recounts a storm in October 1991 that resulted in the Gloucester fishing boat Andrea Gail going down off the coast of Nova Scotia, and the loss of all six crew members: Billy Tyne, Bobby Shatford, Alfred Pierre, David Sullivan, Michael Moran and Dale Murphy.

In 2000, the book was adapted by Warner Brothers as a film of the same name, starring George Clooney and Mark Wahlberg.

Junger said that while recovering from a chainsaw injury, he was inspired to write about dangerous jobs. He planned to start with commercial fishing in Gloucester, Massachusetts. He developed this project as The Perfect Storm, as he became more involved with learning about the crew members and the conditions and decisions that contributed to their deaths.

Junger established The Perfect Storm Foundation to provide cultural and educational grants to children across the country whose parents make their living in the commercial fishing industry.

A Death in Belmont
A Death in Belmont centers on the 1963 rape and murder of Bessie Goldberg. This was during the period from 1962 to 1964 of the infamous Boston Strangler crimes. Junger received the 2007 PEN/Winship award for the book. Junger raises the possibility in his book that the real Strangler was Albert DeSalvo. He eventually confessed to committing several Strangler murders, but not Goldberg's. Roy Smith, an African-American man, was convicted in her death based on circumstantial evidence.

Junger suggests that Smith's conviction for Goldberg's death was influenced by racism. The prosecution called witnesses who remembered seeing Smith chiefly because he was a black man walking in a predominately white neighborhood. (Eyewitness testimony has been shown to be notoriously flawed.) Smith had cleaned Goldberg's house the day she was attacked and left a receipt (for his work) with his name on her kitchen counter. No physical evidence, such as bruises or blood, linked Smith to the crime. In 1976, he was granted commutation of his life sentence. Before he gained release, Smith died of lung cancer.

Junger draws no conclusions about the guilt or innocence of either Smith or DeSalvo. Goldberg's daughter has vigorously disputed Junger's suggestion that Smith may have been innocent. Defense attorney Alan Dershowitz said in his review of the book: It "must be read with the appropriate caution that should surround any work of nonfiction in which the author is seeking a literary or dramatic payoff." He noted that Junger did not include endnotes or footnotes, and suggested he may have had too much interest in "playing down coincidences and emphasizing connections."

Fire
Fire is a collection of articles about dangerous regions or dangerous occupations. In the chapter "Lion in Winter", Junger interviews Ahmad Shah Massoud, leader of the Afghan Northern Alliance and known as the Lion of the Panjshir. He was a famed resistance fighter against the Soviets and the Taliban. Junger was one of the last Western journalists to interview Massoud in depth. Much of this was first published in March 2001 for National Geographic Adventure, along with photographs by Iranian photographer Reza Deghati and video by cinematographer Stephen Cocklin. Massoud was assassinated on September 9, 2001. Junger's portrait of Massoud suggests a different future for the country if he had been able to continue his work. Fire also details the conflict diamond trade in Sierra Leone, genocide in Kosovo, and the hazards of fire-fighting in the state of Idaho in the United States.

Restrepo

In 2009, Junger made his first film, the documentary feature Restrepo, as director with photographer Tim Hetherington. The two worked together in Afghanistan on assignment for Vanity Fair. Junger and Hetherington spent a year with one platoon in the Korengal Valley, which is billed as the deadliest valley in Afghanistan. They recorded video to document their experience, and this footage went on to form the basis for Restrepo. The title refers to the outpost where Junger was embedded, which was named after a combat medic, Pfc. Juan Restrepo, killed in action. As Junger explained, "It's a completely apolitical film. We wanted to give viewers the experience of being in combat with soldiers, and so our cameras never leave their side. There are no interviews with generals; there is no moral or political analysis. It is a purely experiential film." Restrepo, which premiered on the opening night of the 2010 Sundance Film Festival, won the grand jury prize for a domestic documentary. The actor David Hyde Pierce presented the award in Park City, Utah. Junger self-financed the film. Restrepo was nominated for the 2011 Academy Award for Best Documentary.

War
The visits from June 2007 to June 2008 to eastern Afghanistan to the Korengal Valley with Tim Hetherington resulted not only in their reports and pictures published in Vanity Fair in 2008 and the film Restrepo (2010), but also in Junger's best-selling book War (2010), which rewrites and expands upon his Vanity Fair dispatches. Junger in War, tells the story of Staff Sergent Sal Giunta. His actions during the fighting in the Korengal Valley made him the first soldier to still be alive when receiving the Medal of Honor since the Vietnam War. Time magazine named War a "Top Ten Non-fiction Book" of 2010.

Which Way is the Front Line From Here?

In April 2013, Junger's film Which Way is the Front Line From Here? The Life and Time of Tim Hetherington, debuted at the LBJ Presidential Library. Produced in conjunction with HBO Documentary Films, it documents the life of Hetherington, who was killed in 2011 in Libya.

Korengal
The 2014 film Korengal continues to follow the soldiers in Battle Company 2/503 during and after their service in the Korengal Valley.  The film takes a deeper look into the psychology of the men, who are deployed in the rugged mountains of the Korengal Valley. Junger sought to find out what combat did to, and for them, and seek a deeper understanding of why war is meaningful to them.  The film opened in June 2013 in theaters.  It also played at the Pritzker Military Library and Museum, The Pentagon, Army Heritage and Education Foundation Center, Capitol Hill, United States Military Academy, The National Infantry Museum, Little Rock Film Festival, Key West Film Festival, and the DocuWest Film Festival.

The Last Patrol
The last of the trilogy about war and its effects on soldiers, this documentary explores "what it means for combat soldiers to reintegrate into daily American life." Junger recruited former US Army Sgt. Brendan O'Byrne, who appeared in the film Restrepo, US Army soldier David Roels, and Spanish photo-journalist Guillermo Cervera to walk the rail corridor between Washington, D.C., Philadelphia, and Pittsburgh. The journey was planned as a tribute to deceased photographer Tim Hetherington. The film premiered at the Margaret Mead Film Festival and aired on HBO in November. The film played in theaters in New York and Los Angeles, as well as at the Savannah Film Festival, and at Seattle International Film Festival.

Tribe
In Tribe (2016) Junger studies war veterans from an anthropological perspective and asks "How do you make veterans feel that they are returning to a cohesive society that was worth fighting for in the first place?" Junger's premise is that "Soldiers ignore differences of race, religion and politics within their platoon..." and upon return to America, find a fractious society splintered into various competing factions, often hostile to one another.

Freedom
This 2021 travel memoir is an extended meditation on "what it means to be free." In the book, which recounts the experiences of two Afghanistan combat vets, a photojournalist and war reporter, and a black dog named Daisy walking 400 miles along railway lines in south-central Pennsylvania, Junger argues that modern civilization has not made people feel safer or contented in their lives, and the weakening of interpersonal bonds has contributed to a rise of anxiety, depression, and suicide, especially among the wealthiest societies. The main theme from Junger's earlier books, "extolling the superiority, both moral and psychological, of life in small nomadic groups (or small embattled platoons) over modernity under capitalism — appears repeatedly."

Awards and Honors
 2007: 2007 PEN/Winship award for A Death in Belmont 
 2010: Sundance Grand Jury Prize: U.S. Documentary (winner), Academy Award for Best Documentary (nominated) for Restrepo 
 2015: International Press Academy's Humanitarian Award.
 2017: Golden Plate Award of the American Academy of Achievement

See also

 List of American print journalists

References

External links

 
 
 
 Outside magazine, articles.
 Vanity Fair, articles.
 
 The Daily Show interview, May 11, 2010, on his book War
 KGNU interview with Claudia Cragg on his book War
 

1962 births
Living people
20th-century American historians
20th-century American male writers
21st-century American historians
21st-century American male writers
20th-century atheists
21st-century atheists
American atheists
American cinematographers
American documentary film directors
American people of Italian descent
American investigative journalists
American magazine journalists
American male non-fiction writers
American male screenwriters
American military historians
American non-fiction crime writers
American people of Austrian descent
American people of German-Jewish descent
American people of Spanish descent
American television writers
American war correspondents
American writers of Italian descent
American writers of Russian descent
Journalists from New York City
Concord Academy alumni
Film directors from Massachusetts
Film directors from New York City
Film producers from Massachusetts
Film producers from New York (state)
Historians from Massachusetts
Historians from New York (state)
American male television writers
People from Belmont, Massachusetts
People from Concord, Massachusetts
Screenwriters from Massachusetts
Screenwriters from New York (state)
Vanity Fair (magazine) people
War correspondents of the War in Afghanistan (2001–2021)
Wesleyan University alumni
Writers from New York City